White Knight Chronicles{{refn|Known in Japan as 

The official White Knight Chronicles soundtrack was released on 2 dics on July 1, 2009 by Aniplex. The music was composed by Takeshi Inoue, Yumiko Hashizume, and Noriyasu Agematsu. Orchestration was done by Hideo Inai, lyrics by Akihiro Hino, and vocals by Kazco Hamano who sung the main theme song, Travelers and ending theme, Shards of Time.

The North America release of the game removed the original Japanese voices for Travelers and Shards of Time, replacing them with English-dubbing.

Manga
A web exclusive prequel manga called Shirokishi Monogatari: Episode 0 Dogma Senki (White Knight Chronicles Episode 0: Dogma War Chronicleis) was released in 2008. Takashi Ikeda oversaw the story for this prequel with Yūko Satō illustrating the actual manga in collaboration with Media Factory's Comic Alive editorial department. The story takes place 10,000 years before the main game's story in an era embroiled by war and chaos. It follows the story of another White Knight who predates the White Knight hero character of the game.

Reception

White Knight Chronicles received mixed reviews, with an aggregated score of 64/100 on Metacritic. Famitsu gave the game a 29/40, with the reviewers highlighting the online mode as being the source of their main gripes. Despite the lukewarm reviews the game sold well; around 130,000 copies on its first day and around 207,000 in its first week in Japan. Eurogamer gave the game an 8/10, criticizing the multiplayer, with the caveat that "disappointing multiplayer doesn't take away from how enjoyable the game is, or how well-thought-through and impressively integrated its gameplay systems are". The game has received 3/5 stars from X-Play, a 6/10 rating from GameSpot, and a 5.1/10 rating from IGN.

Sequels
A sequel titled White Knight Chronicles II was released in 2010. A prequel titled White Knight Chronicles: Origins was released in 2011.

References

External links

 Official website (SCEI) 
 Official website (Level-5) 

2008 video games
Cooperative video games
Fantasy video games
Fictional knights in video games
Japanese role-playing video games
Level-5 (company) games
PlayStation 3 games
PlayStation 3-only games
Role-playing video games
Sony Interactive Entertainment franchises
Sony Interactive Entertainment games
Video games about spirit possession
Video games developed in Japan
Video games featuring protagonists of selectable gender
Video games set in castles
Video games with customizable avatars
War video games
White Knight Chronicles (video game series)